Seymour Mace is a British comedian and actor.

Mace was born in 1969, and he moved with his family soon afterwards to South Africa as his father worked as a gold miner. The family returned to the UK, to Bedworth, near Coventry.

Mace worked as a clown in the mid-1990s before becoming a stand-up comedian. He was a finalist at the So You Think You're Funny competition at the Edinburgh Festival Fringe in 2001. He has performed several shows at the Fringe, including Marmaduke Spatula's Fuckin' Spectacular Cabaret of Sunshine Show in 2013.

Mace played Steve (and his twin Craig) in the BBC sitcom Ideal between 2005-2010. In 2009, he starred in the horror comedy Zombie Women of Satan. He appeared in the second series of Hebburn as music producer Eric.

In 2010, he appeared on Dave's One Night Stand

Mace also appears in the offbeat comedy film What Happened After Macbeth, which will be released in 2014.

Mace hosted the monthly Giggle Beats Comedy Pub Quiz in Newcastle upon Tyne.

He took part in the 'Laughing for a Change' project in 2014, which aimed to raise awareness of mental health through a comedy tour, also featuring Mrs Barbara Nice and Rob Deering. The project was supported by Time to Change.

In 2015 Mace was nominated for an Edinburgh Comedy Award, for his show Seymour Mace is Niche as F**k!

References

External links

Page on Chortle including tour dates

1969 births
British comedians
Living people